Jostein Nyhamar (23 September 1922 – 30 July 1993) was a Norwegian magazine editor, biographer and politician for the Labour Party.

Jostein Nyhamar was born in Nedre Eiker. He edited the weekly magazine Aktuell from 1959 to 1974, and Forbrukerrapporten from 1974 to 1986. He has written a biography of Einar Gerhardsen as well as volume six of the series Arbeiderbevegelsens historie i Norge, which covers the history of the Norwegian labour movement from 1965 to 1990. He also chaired Bærum Labour Party. He died on 30 July 1993 in Bærum.

Selected works
Politikk for fremtiden 1967
Demokratisk sosialisme 1976
Kjerringer mot strømmen og andre tanker, 1981
Einar Gerhardsen, two volumes, 1982 and 1983
Nye utfordringer (1965–1990), volume 6 of Arbeiderbevegelsens historie i Norge,  1990
Med rødt blekk,  1992

References

1922 births
1993 deaths
People from Buskerud
Norwegian magazine editors
Norwegian biographers
Norwegian male writers
Male biographers
Labour Party (Norway) politicians
Bærum politicians
20th-century Norwegian writers
20th-century biographers
20th-century Norwegian journalists